The  is a railway line in Fuchū, Tokyo, Japan, owned and operated by the private railway operator Keio Corporation.

Services
During weekdays served by two-car local trains goes back and forth between Higashi-Fuchū and Fuchūkeiba-seimommae, while on weekends and holidays (as well as during events at the nearby Tokyo Racecourse) 8-car and 10-car local and express trains are operated through from the Keiō Line.

Stations

History
The line opened on 29 April 1955 as dual track electrified at 600 VDC. The voltage was increased to 1500 VDC in 1963.

References
This article incorporates material from the corresponding article in the Japanese Wikipedia

Keibajo Line
Railway lines in Tokyo
Railway lines opened in 1955
4 ft 6 in gauge railways in Japan
1955 establishments in Japan